Gombe may refer to:

Places
 Gombe State, Nigeria
 Gombe, Nigeria, the capital of Gombe State
 Gombe, Angola
 Gombe, Butambala, the capital of Butambala District in Central Uganda 
 Gombe, Wakiso, a town in Wakiso District, Central Uganda
 Gombe, Kinshasa, in the Democratic Republic of the Congo
 Gömbe, Kaş, a community in the Turkish Riviera

People
 Christian Gombe (born 1962), Central African Republic basketball player
 Kabiru Gombe, Nigerian Islamic teacher under izalah
 Samson Gombe (1938–1989), Kenyan scientist and professor

Other uses
 Cyclone Gombe, a 2022 tropical cyclone in Africa
 Gombe (dish), a traditional Norwegian dish
 Gombey, a dance from Bermuda (sometimes spelt Gombe)

See also
 Gombe Stream National Park, in Tanzania, where Jane Goodall pioneered her behavioral research on the chimpanzee